The Madison County Courthouse in Danielsville, Georgia is a historic courthouse built in 1901.  It was listed on the National Register of Historic Places in 1980.

It has a cruciform plan, similar to that of the Twiggs County Courthouse (1902-04) and of the Clayton County Courthouse.  It was designed by architect J.W. Golucke.

It has painted brickwork and rests on a stone foundation.  The building's brickwork is laid in American bond.  It has a pyramidally capped tower on its front facade.

References

External links 

Courthouses in Georgia (U.S. state)		
National Register of Historic Places in Madison County, Georgia
Romanesque Revival architecture in Georgia (U.S. state)
Government buildings completed in 1901
1901 establishments in Georgia (U.S. state)